The 2017 Judo Grand Prix Hohhot was held at the Inner Mongolia Stadium in Hohhot, China, from 30 June to 2 July 2017.

Medal summary

Men's events

Women's events

Source Results

Medal table

References

External links
 

2017 IJF World Tour
2017 Judo Grand Prix
Judo competitions in China
Judo